The 2017 Commonwealth Shooting Federation Championships were held at the Belmont Shooting Complex in Brisbane, Australia from 28 October to 8 November 2017. It was held in tandem with that year's Oceania Shooting Championships and served as a test event for the 2018 Commonwealth Games.

Medalists

Men

Women

Open

Medal table

References

External links 
 

2017 in shooting sports
International sports competitions hosted by Australia
Sport in Brisbane
2017 in Australian sport
Shooting competitions in Australia